Unity Village is a village in Jackson County, Missouri, United States, bordering Kansas City and Lee's Summit. Its population was 99 at the 2010 census. It is the world headquarters of Unity Church, which has over 2 million followers. The Unity Tower was designed by the Kansas City firm Boillot & Lauck and built in 1929 to store water. Unity Village is part of the Kansas City metropolitan area.

Geography
Unity Village is 15 miles (24.1 km) southeast of downtown Kansas City,

at  (38.946283, -94.399311).

Tornado

On July 1, 2015, a tornado ripped roofs in Unity village to shreds, despite lasting only a few seconds.

Demographics

2010 census
At the 2010 census there were 99 people, 65 households, and 11 families living in the village. The racial makup of the village was 85.9% White, 7.1% African American, 2.0% Asian, and 5.1% from two or more races. Hispanic or Latino of any race were 6.1%.

Of the 65 households 7.7% had children under the age of 18 living with them, 9.2% were married couples living together, 4.6% had a female householder with no husband present, 3.1% had a male householder with no wife present, and 83.1% were non-families. 73.8% of households were one person and 16.9% were one person aged 65 or older. The average household size was 1.32 and the average family size was 2.36.

The median age in the village was 52.5 years. 6.1% of residents were under the age of 18; 5% were between the ages of 18 and 24; 17.2% were from 25 to 44; 55.6% were from 45 to 64; and 16.2% were 65 or older. The gender makeup of the village was 34.3% male and 65.7% female.

2000 census
At the 2000 census there were 140 people, 81 households, and 19 families living in the village. The population density was 73.6 people per square mile (28.4/km). There were 82 housing units at an average density of 43.1 per square mile (16.7/km).  The racial makup of the village was 94.29% White, 2.86% African American, 0.71% Asian, 0.71% from other races, and 1.43% from two or more races. Hispanic or Latino of any race were 5.71%.

Of the 81 households 2.5% had children under the age of 18 living with them, 18.5% were married couples living together, 3.7% had a female householder with no husband present, and 76.5% were non-families. 71.6% of households were one person and 21.0% were one person aged 65 or older. The average household size was 1.35 and the average family size was 2.21.

The age distribution was 2.1% under the age of 18, 7.9% from 18 to 24, 31.4% from 25 to 44, 42.9% from 45 to 64, and 15.7% 65 or older. The median age was 50 years. For every 100 females, there were 62.8 males. For every 100 females age 18 and over, there were 63.1 males.

The median household income was $29,583 and the median family income  was $87,667. Males had a median income of $41,765 versus $30,667 for females. The per capita income for the village was $31,836. There were none of the families and 11.9% of the population living below the poverty line, including no under eighteens and none of those over 64.

References

External links
 

Villages in Jackson County, Missouri
Unity Church
Villages in Missouri